Kirat Janabadi Workers Party is an underground ethnic faction in Nepal. KJWP strives for the creation of a Kirat state in eastern Nepal. KJWP emerged in 2008, and has conducted bombings and extortion drives against Village Development Committees.

References

Political parties in Nepal
Rebel groups in Nepal